The 2004–05 Umaglesi Liga was the sixteenth season of top-tier football in Georgia. It began on 31 July 2004 and ended on 30 May 2005. WIT Georgia were the defending champions.

Locations

League standings

Results
The ten teams will play each other four times in this league for a total of 36 matches per team. In the first half of the season each team played every other team twice (home and away) and then do the same in the second half of the season.

First half of season

Second half of season

Top goalscorers

See also
2004–05 Pirveli Liga
2004–05 Georgian Cup

References
Georgia - List of final tables (RSSSF)

Erovnuli Liga seasons
1
Georgia